Panophthalmitis is the inflammation of all coats of the animal eye including intraocular structures. It can be caused by infection, particularly from Pseudomonas species, such as Pseudomonas aeruginosa, Clostridium species, Whipple's disease, and also fungi. It can also be cause by other stress.

References

Further reading

Chawla, Rohan, et al. "Case report of tuberculous panophthalmitis." Medical Science Monitor 10.10 (2004): CS57-CS59.

External links 

Eye diseases
Inflammations